Kent Monroe is an American economist, focusing in information value of price to consumers, currently the John M. Jones Distinguished Professor of Marketing Emeritus at University of Illinois and previously the Robert O. Goodykoontz Professor at Virginia Tech and Virginia State University, and is an Elected Fellow of Decision Sciences Institute.

In 2007, he was named a fellow of the Association for Consumer Research.

References

Year of birth missing (living people)
Living people
University of Illinois faculty
American economists
Marketing people
University of Illinois alumni
Indiana University alumni
Kalamazoo College alumni